Slavitt is a surname. Notable people with the surname include:

Andy Slavitt (born 1966), American businessman and healthcare advisor
David R. Slavitt (born 1935), American writer, poet, and translator